The Shagalaly (Şağalaly), formerly known as Chaglinka, is a river of northern Kazakhstan. The river flows through the territory of Akmola and North Kazakhstan regions.

The river originates from the Mount Ak-Cheku between knolls in Dzhilandy and Zerenda mountains. It flows northward along a wide valley. It flows into the southern end of the lake Shaglyteniz. The city Kokshetau is located on the river. 

The name "Shagalaly" in translation from Kazakh means "area where there are many seagulls"

Main tributaries 
The largest tributaries of the Shagalaly are, from source to mouth:

 Bala-Kylchakty (right)
 Tosyn (left)
 Kendzheboy (left)

References 

Rivers of Kazakhstan
Rivers of Akmola Region
Rivers of North Kazakhstan Region